Kjetil André Mulelid (born 4 February 1991 in Hurdal, Norway) is a Norwegian jazz pianist and composer known from his own work with Kjetil Mulelid Trio, Kjemilie and Wako, and from collaborations with musicians like Siril Malmedal Hauge, Arve Henriksen, and Trygve Seim

Biography 
In 2014, Mulelid completed his studies at the Jazz program at Norwegian University of Science and Technology in Trondheim, and has thereafter been active with bands like Kjemilie, Wako,  and a number of others. Kjetil Mulelid Trio released their debut album Not Nearly Enough To Buy A House in 2017. Together with bassist Bjørn Marius Hegge and drummer Andreas Skår Winther. The trio is in the same musical landscape as In The Country and Espen Eriksen Trio, with much youthful playfulness and curiosity. Mulelid is inspired by anything from hymns to free jazz, and the music is energetic, rhythmically intricate, harmoniously rich, intimate and with appealing melodies. The tunes on the album are mostly composed by Mulelid, but with room for individual and collective improvisation. The trio have toured in most of Central Europe.

Discography 
Solo

 2021: Piano (Rune Grammofon) 

Kjetil Mulelid Trio
 2022: Who Do You Love the Most? 
 2019: What You Thought Was Home (Rune Grammofon)
 2017: Not Nearly Enough To Buy A House (Rune Grammofon) 
Wako
 2021: Live in Oslo (Øra Fonogram) 
 2020: Wako (Øra Fonogram) 
 2018: Urolige sinn (Øra Fonogram) 
2017: Modes For All Eternity (AMP Music & Records)
2015: The Good Story (Øra Fonogram)
Kjemilie (duo with singer Emilie Storaas)
 2016: Hverdagene (Øra Fonogram)
 2017: Bakkekontakt (Øra Fonogram) 
with Siril Malmedal Hauge

 2019: Uncharted Territory (Jazzland)
 2021: Slowly, Slowly (Jazzland)

with Fieldfare
 2017: Fieldfare (Øra Fonogram) 

with Lauv
 2013: De Som Er Eldre Enn Voksne (ABC Studio)

References

External links 
 Official website

Norwegian jazz pianists
Norwegian male pianists
Norwegian jazz composers
Male jazz composers
1991 births
Living people
Musicians from Hurdal
People from Hurdal
21st-century pianists
21st-century Norwegian male musicians
Rune Grammofon artists